Week-End for Three is a 1941 comedy film directed by Irving Reis and starring Dennis O'Keefe and Jane Wyatt.

Plot summary

Cast
 Dennis O'Keefe as Jim Craig
 Jane Wyatt as Ellen
 Phillip Reed as Randy
 Edward Everett Horton as Stonebraker
 ZaSu Pitts as Anna
 Franklin Pangborn as Number Seven

Reception
The film lost over $100,000 at the box office.

Radio adaptation
Week-End for Three was broadcast on the radio program Stars in the Air March 27, 1952. The 30-minute episode starred Dennis O'Keefe, Barbara Britton, and Harry von Zell.

References

External links
 Weekend for Three at TCMDB
 
 
 

1941 films
American comedy films
1941 comedy films
Films with screenplays by Dorothy Parker
Films scored by Roy Webb
Films directed by Irving Reis
RKO Pictures films
American black-and-white films
1940s American films